Mglinsky (masculine), Mglinskaya (feminine), or Mglinskoye (neuter) may refer to:
Mglinsky District, a district of Bryansk Oblast, Russia
Mglinsky Uyezd (1919–1920), an administrative division of Gomel Governorate in the early Russian SFSR
Mglinsky Urban Administrative Okrug, an administrative division which the town of Mglin in Mglinsky District of Bryansk Oblast, Russia is incorporated as
Mglinskoye Urban Settlement, a municipal formation which Mglinsky Urban Administrative Okrug in Mglinsky District of Bryansk Oblast, Russia is incorporated as